Arvand Gushnasp was an Iranian nobleman, who briefly served as the marzban (governor) of Sasanian Iberia from 540 to 541. He was headquartered in Tbilisi, and was succeeded as marzban by Vezhan Buzmihr.

According to the modern historian Stephen H. Rapp Jr, Arvand Gushnasp may well have been a member of the Mihranid clan, thus perhaps being a Parthian prince by origin, although "one who had come from Iran directly".

References

Sources 
 
 

6th-century deaths
6th-century Iranian people
Sasanian governors of Iberia
Year of birth unknown
Generals of Khosrow I